Street-Legal is the 18th studio album by American singer-songwriter Bob Dylan, released on June 15, 1978, by Columbia Records. The album was a departure for Dylan, who assembled a large pop-rock band with female backing vocalists for its recording.

After receiving positive reviews on his previous album, Desire, Dylan was met with a more lukewarm critical reception for Street-Legal, though the album was still commercially successful, being certified as Gold in the US and Platinum in the UK. Many critics gave the album a more positive re-appraisal following its release in a remixed and remastered edition in 1999.

Background 
Dylan spent the first half of 1977 engaged in divorce proceedings and a custody battle with his first wife, Sara, while editing Renaldo and Clara, an ill-fated film shot during the fall of 1975 on the first leg of his Rolling Thunder Revue tour. With the summer approaching, Dylan took a break from the film and returned to his farm in Minnesota, where he was accompanied by his children and Faridi McFree, with whom Dylan had started a relationship. There he began writing a new set of songs, including "Changing of the Guards," "No Time to Think," and "Where Are You Tonight?". At least six of the nine songs ultimately included on Street-Legal were written during this time.

His work was disrupted on August 16, 1977, when news broke that Elvis Presley had died at 3:30 p.m. at Baptist Memorial Hospital in Memphis, Tennessee. "I went over my whole life," recalled Dylan. "I went over my whole childhood. I didn't talk to anyone for a week."

Later that fall, another custody battle arose when Sara sought permission from the court to move to Hawaii with their children. The proceedings took Dylan's focus away from the world tour he had been planning, his first in twelve years. He had signed a five-year lease on an old three-story building on the corner of Ocean and Main in Santa Monica, California. Dubbed 'Rundown', the building was soon converted into a rehearsal space and studio. By September, the building was staffed by Joel Bernstein and Arthur Rosato, two engineers who had been in Dylan's road crew in 1976.

Before rehearsals could begin, Dylan had to assemble a band. He quickly contacted several musicians, including former Rolling Thunder Revue members Steve Soles, David Mansfield, Rob Stoner, and Howie Wyeth. Stoner recalls, "I thought the Hard Rain thing was the last I'd ever hear from Bob... Then suddenly I get this call - I think Bob called me up personally... and asked me to bring Howie, and a couple of other people, to L.A. to 'just try some things out.'"

Soles, Mansfield, Stoner, Wyeth, pianist Walter Davis, Jr., and percussionist Otis Smith arrived in late November and early December. His players were assembled, yet Dylan was still not ready to rehearse, with the custody battle over his children and the imminent release of Renaldo and Clara occupying most of his attention, making edits on Renaldo and Clara up to the last minute. "Bob kept us sitting around for a week or two," recalls Stoner. "He just never showed up... and [when he finally] drops in, he's distracted... He was really [stressed out]. He was always bummed out. He was chain-smoking and he was really in a bad mood. He was short with people. It just wasn't working out."

A settlement in his custody battle was reached in late December, decreeing that his children would remain in California, with Dylan retaining partial custody. Fallout from the custody battle would keep Dylan and Sara from reaching amicable terms for several years. Meanwhile, Renaldo and Clara was released to widespread negative reviews. Though disappointed with the critical reaction, with the film released and his legal matters settled, Dylan was finally ready to rehearse.

Sessions soon began in earnest. On December 26, Dylan followed the day's rehearsals with a preview of his next album. Accompanying himself on piano, Dylan played his new batch of songs for Stoner, Soles, and Bernstein. Many of these songs had been written that summer at his farm in Minnesota. As rehearsals progressed, it soon became clear the band wasn't "picking up where the Rolling Thunder Revue left off," as Mansfield recalled. "I brought my steel guitar and I had it in rehearsal and every time I'd go to start unpacking it, Bob would go, 'We don't need that.' All of a sudden the instrument that I played all over the place in the previous band, he didn't want to see it, let alone hear it."

Howie Wyeth soon left the band. Wyeth had been struggling with a heroin addiction at the time, recalling, "I knew I couldn't get high once we'd left [for tour]... I realized I was either gonna get busted or I'd end up being tortured to death. So I literally had to just tell Bob one night, 'I can't do it.' That was terrible. He had his own problems. He felt bad that I wasn't gonna do it, and he called me up when I got home to New York and said, 'Are you sure?'"

After auditioning a number of drummers ("maybe ten or a dozen" by Bernstein's estimates), Dylan replaced Wyeth with Denny Seiwell, who briefly played with Paul McCartney and Wings.

When rehearsal was held on December 30, the band now included Stoner, Mansfield, Soles, guitarist Jesse Ed Davis, and singers Katey Sagal, Debbie Dye Gibson, and Frannie Eisenberg. This rehearsal was mostly dedicated to rearrangements of classic Dylan compositions, drawing on adult contemporary pop. (Wayne Newton, Barry Manilow, Marvin Hamlisch). As biographer Clinton Heylin writes, "[Dylan] began to impose a grander vision on whatever sound the Revue veterans had initially conceived. With his love of fatback R&B, it should have come as no surprise that he hankered after a band with a saxophone player and female singers... The band he assembled in the two months before the 1978 world tour shares many similarities with the big band he had attempted to impose on Desire. The girl singers/sax/keyboards combination also reflected elements of the extravagantly presented shows Presley had been playing in the 1970's."

By mid-January 1978, Dylan was still unsatisfied with some aspects of the band. With the first leg of his world tour set for February in Japan, he quickly made some last-minute changes, removing Sagal and Eisenberg and replacing them with novice singer Helena Springs and seasoned professional Jo Ann Harris. (Sagal was not surprised by her dismissal. "I remember... he'd have three girls all sing a part that was not in our range," Sagal recalls, "and we were too terrified to say anything.")

In the meantime, Seiwell was let go; during his brief stint with Wings, he and the rest of Wings were busted for drug possession in Sweden, prompting Japanese officials to deny him an entry visa. A number of auditions were quickly arranged, and according to Stoner, they "settled" on former King Crimson drummer Ian Wallace. Although Wallace's drumming would become problematic ("The man had a beat like a cop," recalls Stoner), time had run out as the tour was almost upon them. The Danish/American guitarist Billy Cross was also brought in and eventually Dylan's touring band was solidified with Cross, Wallace, keyboardist Alan Pasqua, percussionist Bobbye Hall, and saxophonist Steve Douglas, Mansfield, Stoner, Soles, and the back-up singers.

In the final two weeks of rehearsal Dylan began settling on new tour arrangements for his classic, earlier recordings. Rob Stoner recalls, "a telegram arrived from the Japanese promoter, and in it he had a manifest of the songs he expected Bob to do on this tour. In other words he was a jukebox, he was playing requests. "We don't want you coming here and doing like your new experimental material, or getting up there and jamming." As Heylin writes, "though the idea of a big band had always appealed to Dylan, the reality was a whole series of new arrangements, to make each song different and to highlight the band's demonstrable versatility..." Often the arrangement ideas came from the band. As Stoner observed, when they put these arrangements to Dylan, "Sometimes he'd like it and he'd use it, and other times he'd say, 'Forget it'."

The band flew to Japan on February 16, 1978, and the tour drew considerable praise from the audience and press, in both Japan and Australia. Later documented on Bob Dylan At Budokan, this tour was marked by bold new arrangements of classic Dylan recordings. During the course of these two-hour-plus shows, Dylan often recast familiar songs in more contemporary guise. However, some of the band members, including Stoner, were not entirely satisfied with Dylan's new sound. "He had in mind to do something like Elvis Presley," recalls Stoner. "That size band and the uniforms... he wasn't very sure about it, which is why he opened way out of town. I mean, we didn't go any place close to Europe or England or America [for] forever, man... and I don't blame him. I think he knew, subconsciously, he was making a big mistake."

The tour ended on April 1 at the Sydney Sportsground in Australia. When it was over, Stoner informed Dylan that he was leaving the band. Dylan was planning to record his next album upon returning to Los Angeles, but with Stoner gone, Dylan hired a new bass player, Jerry Scheff. Scheff was best known for his work with Elvis Presley in the 1970s as a member of his TCB Band, and on The Doors' final recordings.

With Scheff replacing Stoner, Dylan began recording his new material with his touring band. Sessions were held at Rundown, with Dylan renting a mobile truck to record the proceedings. (The mobile truck was equipped with 24-track capabilities, something his studio didn't have.) "I didn't want to do it there," Dylan later recalled. "[I] couldn't find the right producer, but it was necessary to do it. So we just brought in the remote truck and cut it, [and] went for a live sound." Dylan would ultimately settle on Don DeVito as his producer, even though he had been dissatisfied with DeVito's work on Desire.

Dylan already had a European tour scheduled for June, but he still had enough time to record his album; over the course of just four days, Dylan would record nine of his own compositions. Dylan knew exactly which songs he wanted to record, and though three songs written by Helena Springs were also recorded during these sessions ("Coming from the Heart," "Walk Out in the Rain," "Stop Now"), there is no indication that these songs were ever serious contenders for the album.

Though the sessions lasted only four days, they were plagued with issues stemming from recording in a makeshift rehearsal space instead of a studio. "The biggest problem... was how it was recorded," recalls Mansfield, "with Bob getting impatient with the engineering assistants... baffling and checking levels and getting sounds in sync... and the recording crew just having to scramble to get mikes into place and get something on tape, while we were playing the thing the few times we were gonna play it.  It really was sort of like Bob Dylan meets Phil Spector in the best way... as if it had [just] been recorded so the instruments sounded full and well-blended."

Outtakes
Unlike previous albums, the outtakes for Street-Legal are few in number. Only three additional songs were recorded for the album, of which none have seen release. There are two takes of "Stop Now", sounding very much like an additional Street-Legal song, in circulation. The Searchers would record "Coming From The Heart (The Road Is Long)" and Eric Clapton would release "Walk Out In the Rain" on his album Backless, which also included another song written at this time, "If I Don't Be There By Morning".

"Coming from the Heart (The Road Is Long)" (Bob Dylan and Helena Springs)
"Stop Now" (Bob Dylan and Helena Springs)
"Walk Out in the Rain" (Bob Dylan and Helena Springs)

Other songs written during this time include:

"Am I Your Stepchild"
"If I Don't Be There By Morning" (Bob Dylan and Helena Springs)
"Legionnaire's Disease"
"Love You Too Much" (Bob Dylan and Greg Lake)

Aftermath

Following the twin successes of Blood on the Tracks and Desire, Street-Legal was another gold record for Dylan, peaking at No. 11 on the U.S. Billboard charts, making it his first studio album to miss the U.S. Top 10 since 1964. However, it became his best-selling studio album in the UK, reaching No. 2 on the charts (his highest position in eight years) and achieving platinum status with 300,000 copies sold (the only other Dylan album to do this is The Essential Bob Dylan).

When Street-Legal was released, it was dismissed by the American press. Crawdaddy! critic Jon Pareles remarked that "Dylan still needs a producer," but others found fault with both the songs and the performances. Greil Marcus criticized the singing as "simply impossible to pay attention to for more than a couple of minutes at a time" and accused "Is Your Love in Vain?" of sexism, claiming Dylan was "speak[ing] to the woman like a sultan checking out a promising servant girl for VD."

In the UK, reviews were positive, with Michael Watts of Melody Maker proclaiming it Dylan's "best album since John Wesley Harding". NME'''s Angus MacKinnon hailed it as Dylan's "second major album of the 70s." In contrast to the record's still mixed reputation, Q Magazine has given the album a 5 star rating on re-release on two occasions, pointing out that the original muddiness of the production was part of the reason the record has so long been critically overlooked.

When Dylan embarked on his European tour, he would be greeted by a generally warm audience reception, and his single, "Baby, Stop Crying" (the lyrics of which were allegedly inspired by Robert Johnson's "Stop Breaking Down"), would chart in the top ten throughout Europe, and reached number 13 on the UK Singles Chart with the album peaking at number 2 on the album chart. In the US, however, the single failed to crack the top 100 and the album itself peaked at number 11, ending Dylan's string of number 1 albums in America until 2006's Modern Times. When Dylan continued his tour in America, it would be derided by the American press as the Alimony Tour and later the Vegas Tour, much to Dylan's chagrin.

Many years later, even Street-Legal's most ardent admirers would admit some flaws in the album, finding most fault with the production. "Street-Legal would be the first in a long line of song collections whose failure to be realized in the studio would lay a 'dust of rumors' over Dylan as an abidingly creative artist that he has never been able to fully shake," writes Heylin.

This LP was pressed at the same time as a Pink Floyd, "Wish You Were Here" 1978 repress was being prepared, so many (exact quantity unknown, possibly 300 per stamper) of LP's marked Pink Floyd "WYWH" actually contain side one of Street Legal by Bob Dylan.

The original 1978 LP sleeve credits mastering to Stan Kalina at CBS Recording Studios NY; the album was produced by Don DeVito.  In 1999, DeVito revisited Street-Legal and remixed the album with modern, digital techniques in an attempt to improve the mix and produce a richer overall sound.  The remix was also used in a 2003 SACD reissue of Street-Legal.  However, in 2013, when Street-Legal was remastered as part of The Complete Album Collection Vol. 1'',  the original 1978 Kalina mix was reinstated.

Track listing

Personnel

Musicians
 Bob Dylan – vocals, rhythm guitar
 Steve Douglas – tenor saxophone, soprano saxophone
 David Mansfield – violin, mandolin
 Alan Pasqua – keyboards
 Billy Cross – electric guitar
 Steven Soles – rhythm guitar, background vocals
 Jerry Scheff – bass guitar
 Ian Wallace – drums
 Bobbye Hall – percussion
 Carolyn Dennis, JoAnn Harris, Helena Springs – backing vocals
 Steve Madaio – trumpet on "Is Your Love in Vain?"

Technical personnel
 Don DeVito –  "Captain in Charge"
 Biff Dawes – engineering
 Stan Kalina – mastering engineer at CBS Recording Studios in New York City
 Michael H. Brauer, Ryan Hewitt – remixing engineering (1999 edition)
 Filmways/Heider – recording studio
 Mary Alice Artes – "Queen Bee"
 Larry Kegan – "Champion of All Causes"
 Ava Megna – "Secretary of Goodwill"
 Arthur Rosato – "Second in Command"

Charts

Weekly charts

Year-end charts

Certifications

References

1978 albums
Albums produced by Don DeVito
Bob Dylan albums
Columbia Records albums